Stony Bar Creek is a  long first-order tributary to Marshyhope Creek in Dorchester County, Maryland.  This is the only stream of this name in the United States.

Variant names
According to the Geographic Names Information System, it has also been known historically as:
Little Indian Creek

Course

Watershed
Stony Bar Creek drains  of area, receives about 44.0 in/year of precipitation and is about 17.85% forested.

See also
List of Maryland rivers

References

Rivers of Maryland
Rivers of Dorchester County, Maryland
Tributaries of the Nanticoke River